Stephen Bunting (born 9 April 1985) is an English professional darts player who competes in events of the Professional Darts Corporation (PDC). Nicknamed The Bullet, Bunting won the 2014 BDO World Darts Championship and is a twice former World Masters champion.

Darts career

Beginnings
Bunting won both the British Teenage Open and the World Youth Masters in 2001 and also captured the WDF Europe Youth Cup in 2002. He made his BDO World Darts Championship debut in 2004 aged 18, where he beat Vincent van der Voort in the first round before losing in the second round to former World Champion Ted Hankey. He returned to Lakeside in 2005 but was beaten in the first round by John Henderson.

In 2008 Bunting won the Lytham St Annes Open and was also recalled to the England squad. In July 2008 he reached the quarter-finals of the BDO British Classic where he lost to Scotland's Ross Montgomery live on Setanta. In November 2008 Bunting captured his maiden BDO ranked open title when he won the Northern Ireland Open, beating fellow Cheshire player Darryl Fitton two sets to nil in the Final.

Bunting was successful in qualifying for the 2009 BDO World Darts Championship as the standby qualifier, but was beaten by Gary Robson in the first round.

On 21 May 2009 Bunting finished joint fourth in the Dutch Pentathlon in Oosterhout, Netherlands. The pentathlon had a field of 20 BDO and PDC players and was won by Gary Anderson with Scott Waites 2nd and Gary Robson 3rd. It was played in Oosterhout Holland.

Bunting competed in the Winmau British Classic on 25 July 2009. He played Dave Chisnall in the semi final and beat him 2–0 in sets.  In the final Bunting played Scott Waites, where he came out the eventual winner 2 sets to 1 with a 170 finish in the fifth leg.

Bunting qualified for the 2010 BDO World Championship, beating the debuting Ian White 3–0 in the first round before losing to top seed Tony O'Shea 4–0 in the second round. The following year, Bunting once again qualified and won his first round match 3–0, this time against Brian Woods with the tournament highest average of 94.62. Bunting then defeated Scott Waites in the second round 4–2 averaging 89.79 to reach his first World Championship quarter-final, where he was beaten 5–1 by third seed Dean Winstanley with both players averaging over the 90 mark.

September 2011 saw Bunting reach the Quarterfinals of the Winmau World Masters on ESPN. Bunting had been playing all morning to fight through to the live televised stages and in the deciding match Bunting defeated Wayne Warren. Bunting was into the last 32 and played Peter Johns from Wales. Bunting won 3–0 in sets and played Robbie Green in the last 16. Bunting won 3–1 with per dart average of 30.33. In the Quarter Finals Bunting lost 3 sets to nil against Ross Montgomery.

On 30 September 2011 Bunting played in the England Classic at Bunn Leisure, in Selsey Sussex. Bunting was the defending champion having won the title in 2010. Bunting started the day with a 3–0 win over Steve Gurney, followed up by a 3–0 win over Mark Davis. In the last 64 defeated Trevor Chant 3–0. In the last 32 Bunting beat Clive Barden 3–2.  The last 16 saw Bunting defeat Sam Rooney 3–0.  Bunting defeated Dean Jones 4–0 in the quarterfinal.  In the semi final Bunting defeated Tony Andrews 5–1 with a per dart average of 30.27. In the final Bunting defeated Jamie Robinson 6–3 with a per dart average of 29.10. Bunting won the £2,500 first prize for the second time.

On 22 October 2011 Bunting won his first European event at the Tops of Ghent tournament in Belgium.  In the last 256 Bunting defeated Billy Caluwaerts (Belgium) 4–2. Bunting then defeated Marcel Blik (Netherlands) 4–1 in the last 128 round. In the last 64 Bunting played his Lancashire county team mate Gary Hooper and won 4–2. In the last 32 Bunting played another Lancashire county team mate and newly crowned Romanian Open Champion Joe Murnan. Bunting won 4–3.  In the last 16 Bunting played Martin Atkins 'The Assassin' who is a regular in the BDO World Championships. Bunting had a 4–1 victory. In the Quarterfinals Bunting played Christian Kist. Bunting won the tie 5–1 to gain a place in the Semi Finals. In the semi final Bunting played Darryl Fitton. Bunting ran out a 2 sets to 0 victor. In the final Bunting played Steve West.  Bunting took the title 3–0 (2–3; 2–3; 1–3) in sets. Bunting won €1600 in prize money.

Bunting played in the PDC UK Open as an amateur entrant, and played two-time and defending champion James Wade in the second round. Bunting led the best-of-seven legs match 3–2 and had four match darts in the deciding leg – one at bullseye and three at double-19 – but was eventually defeated 4–3.

World Masters and World Champion
In October 2012, Bunting took his largest career title by winning the Winmau World Masters as the number one seed, defeating Tony O'Shea 7–4 in the final. In December, Bunting won the Zuiderduin Masters, by defeating Alan Norris in the final. Bunting finished 2012 at BDO and WDF World number one.

At the 2013 BDO World Championship, Bunting recorded the highest average of the first round in beating James Wilson 3–2, but in the second round he was unexpectedly defeated by Darryl Fitton 4–2 despite once again recording the highest average of the round. Bunting led 2–1 and had five darts at double top to take a 3–1 lead, but was unable to take the chance and Fitton went on to win six of the next eight legs to clinch victory. At the 2013 Isle of Man tournament final Bunting defeated Darryl Fitton 4–2 to win the title. He then won the Mariflex Open, the Welsh Open and the England Open.
In July, Bunting won the England Masters title at the Pontins Southport beating Paul Jennings in the final 6–5. In the semi-final Bunting defeated Tony O'Shea 5–3.

Bunting successfully retained the World Masters title in 2013, becoming only the fourth man to do so after Eric Bristow, Bob Anderson, and Martin Adams. He also became the first man in history to win the title without dropping a single set. His tournament included a 6-0 semi-final win over world #4 Darryl Fitton, and a 7-0 final win over world #2 James Wilson.  At the Zuiderduin Masters, Bunting reached the final for the second straight year but this time was comprehensively beaten by Wilson, 5-1 in sets.

Bunting entered the 2014 BDO World Championship as the number one seed for the second year in a row. He defeated Jim Widmayer 3-1 in the first round, Dave Prins 4-0 in the second round with the tournament's highest three-dart average (100.65), and Rick Hofstra 5-2 in the quarter finals after Hofstra led 2-0 and had chances to win the fourth and sixth sets. In the semi-final, Bunting beat fourth seed Robbie Green 6-1 to set up a final with Alan Norris, which Bunting won 7-4 after the match had been level at 3-3.

Switch to the PDC
On 22 January 2014, it was announced that Bunting had received and accepted a tour card to join the Professional Darts Corporation. Bunting's first tournaments were the UK Open Qualifiers and he won the second and £10,000 by beating eight players, concluding with a 6–5 victory over Andrew Gilding. The result saw him enter the 2014 UK Open at the third round stage where he made his PDC televised debut against Kevin Dowling. Dowling threw for the match in the penultimate leg and missed match darts before Bunting stepped in to take out a 151 finish and sealed a 9–8 victory in the next leg to set up a meeting with Dean Winstanley. Bunting missed a dart at double 12 to start the match with a nine-dart finish, but went on to lose 9–6. He made his European Tour debut at the German Darts Masters and won through to the semi-finals where he lost 6–3 to Phil Taylor. Bunting's second PDC final came at the 10th Players Championship, in a run which included a victory over world number one Michael van Gerwen, before being defeated 6–3 by Terry Jenkins. He made his debut in the World Matchplay against Peter Wright and he beat the world number five 10–6. In the subsequent round he started badly against Gary Anderson to trail 5–0 and could never recover the deficit as he was defeated 13–8. In August he made his first World Series of Darts appearance as he was given a wildcard pick for the Sydney Darts Masters. Bunting beat John Weber, Wright and James Wade to reach the final where Taylor defeated him 11–3.

In October, Bunting reached the semi-finals of the World Grand Prix by beating Ronnie Baxter, Wright and Richie Burnett. He was defeated 4–0 by Michael van Gerwen, with the Dutchman winning three of the four sets in deciding legs. Bunting produced a superb performance in the second round of the European Championship as he averaged 102.21 in beating Taylor 10–9 having never been behind during the match and missed a double 12 for a nine-dart finish. He was unable to replicate the performance in the quarter-finals against Terry Jenkins as he was eliminated 10–7. Bunting reached the quarter-finals for the third major event in a row by beating Wade 10–8 at the Grand Slam of Darts, but lost 16–9 against Mervyn King. In the Players Championship Finals he was defeated 10–5 by Anderson in the second round.

2015
In his debut at the 2015 PDC World Darts Championship, Bunting saw off Robert Marijanović 3–1 in his first match, before defeating an out of sorts James Wade 4–1. He played fellow St. Helens player Michael Smith in the third round and eliminated him 4–2, after surviving a comeback when Smith rallied from 3–0 down. Both players averaged 102 and hit eight 180s each during a high quality match. In an extremely close quarter-final clash with Raymond van Barneveld there was never more than a set between the players as they both averaged 98.30. Bunting could not win a leg in the deciding set to be defeated 5–4 and end his chances of becoming the first player to hold both versions of the World Championship at the same time. After Van Barneveld stated that his opponent's performance had shown he was a world class player, Bunting was left in tears on stage in the post-match interview.

Following the World Championship final, Bunting was named as a Sky Sports Wildcard to compete in the 2015 Premier League Darts. He drew 6–6 with Wade on the opening night. In the following weeks, Bunting would fall into the relegation zone, losing his next three games before winning his first game against Adrian Lewis 7–3 in the fifth week. He survived relegation by a point, but could only win one of his last seven matches to finish eighth in the league.

In March, Bunting would make it to the semi-finals of the UK Open, beating Adam Huckvale, Michael Smith, Dave Chisnall, William O'Connor and Mervyn King before being defeated 10–0 by Peter Wright with an average of just 82.39 over 20 points lower than Wright. He lost 10–6 to Ian White in the first round of the World Matchplay and took out just 19% of his finishes in the opening round of the World Grand Prix to be eliminated 2–1 in sets by Mark Webster. He lost in the first round of the Players Championship Finals and second round of the European Championship. Bunting did reach the quarter-finals of the inaugural World Series of Darts Finals, but was heavily beaten 10–3 by Phil Taylor.

2016
Bunting met Raymond van Barneveld at the World Championship for the second successive year, this time in the second round. Once again there was never a set between the players, with Van Barneveld taking the final set by six legs to four. Bunting did not receive a wildcard for a second appearance at the Premier League this year. He reached the fifth round of the UK Open, but was beaten by Joe Cullen 9–7. En route to the final of the second Players Championship event, Bunting overturned a 5–0 deficit against Adrian Lewis to win 6–5. He then earned his second PDC title by overcoming Michael van Gerwen 6–4. Despite averaging 102.48, he was only ahead of Mensur Suljović in the first leg of their opening round World Matchplay match as he lost 10–8. A week later Bunting reached the semi-finals of the European Darts Open and was defeated 6–4 by Peter Wright. He was knocked out in the second round of both the World Grand Prix and European Championship, 3–0 in sets by Kim Huybrechts and 10–4 by Jelle Klaasen respectively.

2017
Bunting missed seven darts for the match in his first round tie with Darren Webster at the 2017 World Championship and bowed out 3–2 in sets.

2018
At the 2018 World Championship, he lost 3–1 in the first round to Dimitri Van den Bergh.

2019
At the 2019 World Championship, he lost 3–1 in the second round to Luke Humphries.
Bunting returned to form in 2019, making two ranking finals and reaching the quarter-finals of both the 2019 World Matchplay and the 2019 Players Championship Finals.

2020
After three years without a win at the World Championship, he made it to the last 16 at the 2020 edition, beating Jose Justicia and Jonny Clayton, before being whitewashed 4–0 by world no. 1 Michael van Gerwen.
As a result of his 2019 runs to the quarter-finals in the majors, he was selected for a return to the Premier League, appearing as a 'challenger' for the night in Liverpool.

In October, Bunting tested positive for COVID-19 and was forced to withdraw from the 2020 World Grand Prix.

2021
Bunting began 2021 on a high by reaching the semi-finals of the 2021 World Championship beating Andy Boulton, James Wade, Ryan Searle and Krzysztof Ratajski on the way, before being eliminated by the eventual champion, Gerwyn Price. Bunting later reached the semi-finals of the 2021 World Grand Prix, following victories over Daryl Gurney, Wade and Searle. Once again, Bunting was beaten by Price in the semi-finals.

2022
At the 2022 World Championship, he lost 3–2 in the second round to Ross Smith.

2023
At the 2023 World Championship, he lost 5–3 in the quarter-finals to eventual champion Michael Smith.

Personal life
Bunting initially used "Surfin' Bird" as his entrance music as a humorous nod to remarks that he resembles Peter Griffin from the animated show Family Guy, the song being long associated with the animated character. He supports Liverpool FC and St Helens R.F.C. He has a son called Toby (born 2012).

Career finals

BDO major finals: 5 (4 titles, 1 runner-up)

WDF major finals: 1 (1 runner-up)

PDC world series finals: 1 (1 runner-up)

World Championship results

BDO
 2004: Second round (lost to Ted Hankey 0–3)
 2005: First round (lost to John Henderson 0–3)
 2009: First round (lost to Gary Robson 1–3)
 2010: Second round (lost to Tony O'Shea 0–4) 
 2011: Quarter-finals (lost to Dean Winstanley 1–5)
 2013: Second round (lost to Darryl Fitton 2–4)
 2014: Winner (beat Alan Norris 7–4)

PDC
 2015: Quarter-finals (lost to Raymond van Barneveld 4–5)
 2016: Second round (lost to Raymond van Barneveld 3–4)
 2017: First round (lost to Darren Webster 2–3)
 2018: First round (lost to Dimitri Van den Bergh 1–3)
 2019: Second round (lost to Luke Humphries 1–3)
 2020: Fourth round (lost to Michael van Gerwen 0–4)
 2021: Semi-finals (lost to Gerwyn Price 4–6)
 2022: Second round (lost to Ross Smith 2–3)
 2023: Quarter-finals (lost to Michael Smith 3–5)

Performance timeline
BDO

PDC

PDC European Tour

Notes

References

External links
Personal website

{{#ifexpr:<21|}}

1985 births
English darts players
Living people
Sportspeople from Liverpool
British Darts Organisation players
Professional Darts Corporation current tour card holders
BDO world darts champions
PDC ranking title winners